Arbo Valdma (born 20 February 1942 in Pärnu) is an Estonian pianist and music pedagogue. He is a professor of piano at the University of Music in Cologne (Germany). He received his musical education at the Music Academy in Tallinn (Estonia) under Bruno Lukk (himself a student of Arthur Schnabel and Paul Hindemith) and later with Nina Emelyanova (a former student of Samuel Feinberg) at the Tchaikovsky Conservatory in Moscow (Masters and Doctorate degrees).

Career
He performed as a soloist with many orchestras and with conductors including N. Järvi, K. Sanderling, E. Klas. A. Janson, A. Rabinowitsch, O. Danon, N. Debelic, I. Drazinic, A. Nanut, P. Despalj, A. Kolar and others. As chamber musician, he has performed with many well known musicians including Mstislav Rostropovich, Walter Despalj, Fern Raskovic among others. In 1984, he was appointed Professor of Piano and Piano Pedagogy and Head of the Piano Department at the University of Belgrade (former Yugoslavia). From 1989 to 1992, he was also Dean of the Piano Faculty at the Academy of Arts at the University of Novi Sad.

Vocational pedagogue, researcher, and author of numerous pedagogical publications, he has given more than 150 Masterclasses around the world in cities such as Moscow, Rome, Thessaloniki, Athens, Calgary, Tokyo, Montepulciano, Liechtenstein, Ohrid, Subotica, Belgrade, Zagreb, Novi Sad, Ljubljana, Kaohsiung, Dubrovnik, Bad Sobernheim, Cologne, Orlando, Las Vegas, Los Angeles, Atlanta, Sendai, and many others. Arbo Valdma was a founding member of EPTA (European Piano Teachers Association) Department in Yugoslavia (established in 1988); Honorary President of EPTA Serbia and an Honorary Member of EPTA in Estonia. In 1991, he was awarded Doctor Honoris Causa grade by Estonian Music Academy.

His students have won numerous prizes at the most prestigious international piano competitions: Brussels (Queen Elisabeth), Vienna (Beethoven), Vevey (Clara Haskil), Cologne (F. Chopin), Epinal, Geneva, Lausanne, Leeds, Munich, Sydney, Vercelli, Washington and others. He has also produced numerous television and radio shows where often his students performed with an exceptionally high standard.

Arbo Valdma has received worldwide praise through his performances at international symposiums and is considered to be one of the greatest piano teachers and pedagogues in the world today.

References

External links
Biography in German
Biography in French

1942 births
Living people
Estonian classical pianists
Serbian classical pianists
Academic staff of the University of Arts in Belgrade
Academic staff of the University of Belgrade
Academic staff of the University of Novi Sad
People from Pärnu
20th-century Estonian musicians
21st-century Estonian musicians
21st-century classical pianists